Oľšavka is a village and municipality in the Spišská Nová Ves District in the Košice Region of central-eastern Slovakia.

History
In historical records the village was first mentioned in 1245.

Geography
The village lies at an altitude of 430 metres and covers an area of 3.018 km².
In 2011 had a population of 192 inhabitants.

External links
http://en.e-obce.sk/obec/olsavka/olsavka.html
http://www.statistics.sk/mosmis/eng/run.html
http://www.olsavka.sk

Villages and municipalities in Spišská Nová Ves District